Chekavar is a 2010 Malayalam-language action thriller film written and directed by Sajeevan. It stars Indrajith, Kalabhavan Mani, Sarayu and Samvrutha Sunil in the lead roles. Its music was composed by Rahul Raj with lyrics penned by Anil Panachooran. The film released on 8 October 2010. Indrajith Sukumaran plays the role of a  police officer while Kalabhavan Mani plays an underworld don. The story progresses as both of them fight each other, for their siblings.

Plot
This is an action thriller Malayalam movie about a sub inspector Kasinathan (Indrajith Sukumaran), who leads a happily life with his family in his hometown. His life takes a turn when he met with Raghavan (Kalabhavan Mani), after he is transferred to Kochi to a police station, where Raghavan is an underworld don. How he escapes his sister from Rocky (Sreejith Ravi), brother of Raghavan, who wants to marry Kasinathan's sister Gowri (Sarayu) as an act of revenge for beating him and his friends when he they were molesting the daughter of a constable in his station after he is released from jail. Raghavan approaches Kasinathan with a proposal to marry off Gowri to Rocky, when he objects strongly.

Cast
 Indrajith as Kashinathan
 Kalabhavan Mani as "Garudan" Raghavan
 Sreejith Ravi as "Udumbu" Rocky
 Jagathy Sreekumar as Bahuleyan
 Suraj Venjaramood as Gunashekaran
 Samvrutha Sunil as Jyothi
 Sarayu as Gauri
 Kalashala Babu as Shekaran
 Subair as DYSP Menon
 Janardhanan as P.M Vasudhevan
 Ajith Kollam as Musthafa
 Saju Kodiyan as Party Member Surendran
 T. P. Madhavan as Madhavan
 Lakshmipriya as Indu

Soundtrack

The original music and background score of the film, are composed, arranged, programmed and produced by Rahul Raj, and the lyrics for the songs are penned by Anil Panachooran. The audio rights were bought by, a Bangalore-based music label, Tune4 Music, marking their entry into Malayalam Film Industry. The audio was launched on 19 August, in a function held at The Wyte Fort Hotel, Cochin, in the presence of actor Prithviraj. The audio recorded excellent sales on the first day, and has received generally positive reviews from both critics and Rahul Raj fans. The Audio contains a total of thirteen tracks, out of which 3 are songs, and the rest are extracts from the background score of the film. This is the first time in the Malayalam industry, extracts from the score are being released as a motion picture soundtrack.

Production
The Pooja of the film was held in February 2010, and the shooting began in Kerala at the end of February 2010.

See also
Chekavar

References

External links
 location news

2010s Malayalam-language films
Films scored by Rahul Raj
2010 action thriller films
2010 films
Indian action thriller films